Nicole Klarides-Ditria (born November 17, 1968) is an American politician who has served in the Connecticut House of Representatives from the 105th district since 2017. Her sister, Themis Klarides, is the former Minority Leader of the Connecticut House of Representatives.

References

1968 births
Living people
American people of Greek descent
People from Seymour, Connecticut
21st-century American politicians
21st-century American women politicians
Women state legislators in Connecticut
Republican Party members of the Connecticut House of Representatives